Callum James Bell is a biologist. He is the president of the National Center for Genome Resources. Bell completed a Ph.D. at University of Edinburgh where he researched the gravitational biology of Arabidopsis thaliana. His 1988 dissertation was titled Studies of mutants of Arabidopsis thaliana (L.) heynh with altered responses to gravity.

References

External links 

Living people
Year of birth missing (living people)
20th-century biologists
21st-century biologists
Alumni of the University of Edinburgh